Spilios Zakharopoulos (born 2 February 1950) is a Greek middle-distance runner. He competed in the 1500 metres at the 1972 Summer Olympics and the 1976 Summer Olympics.

References

External links
 

1950 births
Living people
Athletes (track and field) at the 1972 Summer Olympics
Athletes (track and field) at the 1976 Summer Olympics
Greek male middle-distance runners
Olympic athletes of Greece
Place of birth missing (living people)
Sportspeople from the Peloponnese
People from Messenia